Guy Rhys John Mansfield, 6th Baron Sandhurst,  (born 3 March 1949), is a British barrister, hereditary peer and Conservative member of the House of Lords.

He served as Chairman of the General Council of the Bar in 2005. He is the current Chairman of Research for the Society of Conservative Lawyers.

Lord Sandhurst was elected as a member of the House of Lords on 17 June 2021 in a Conservative hereditary peers' by-election. He took office on 23 June 2021.  He made his maiden speech on 14 September 2021 during the Crime, Police & Sentencing Bill.

References

1949 births
Living people
Barons in the Peerage of the United Kingdom
Mansfield, Guy
Conservative Party (UK) hereditary peers
Hereditary peers elected under the House of Lords Act 1999